Landmark Cases in the Law of Restitution (2006) is a book edited by Charles Mitchell and Paul Mitchell, which outlines the key cases in English unjust enrichment law and restitution.

Content
The cases discussed are,

Lampleigh v Brathwait (1615)
Moses v Macferlan (1760)
Taylor v Plumer (1815)
Planche v Colburn (1831)
Marsh v Keating (1834)
Erlanger v New Sombrero Phosphate Co (1878)
Phillips v Homfray (1883)
Allcard v Skinner (1887)
Sinclair v Brougham (1914)
Fibrosa Spolka Akcyjna v Fairbairn Lawson Coombe Barbour Ltd (1942)
Re Diplock (1948)
Solle v Butcher (1950)

See also
Landmark case
Restitution in English law
Landmark Cases in the Law of Contract (2008) by Charles Mitchell and Paul Mitchell
Landmark Cases in the Law of Tort (2010) by Charles Mitchell and Paul Mitchell
Landmark Cases in Family Law (2011) by Stephen Gilmore, Jonathan Herring and Rebecca Probert
Landmark Cases in Equity (2012) by Charles Mitchell and Paul Mitchell (6 Jul 2012) 
Landmark Cases in Land Law (2013) by Nigel Gravells

English law
2008 non-fiction books
Law books